The 1927 Marquette Golden Avalanche football team was an American football team that represented Marquette University as an independent during the 1927 college football season. In its sixth season under head coach Frank Murray, the team compiled a 6–3 record, shut out five of nine opponents, and outscored all opponents by a total of 153 to 49. The team played its home games at Marquette Stadium in Milwaukee.

Frank Murray was Marquette's head football coach for 19 years and was posthumously inducted into the College Football Hall of Fame in 1983.

Schedule

References

Marquette
Marquette Golden Avalanche football seasons
Marquette Golden Avalanche football